

Sovereign states

A
Afghanistan – Emirate of Afghanistan
Agadez – Tenere Sultanate of Aïr
 Andorra – Principality of Andorra
 Ankole – Kingdom of Ankole
Angoche – Angoche Sultanate 
 – Argentine Republic
 Aro – Aro Confederacy
 – Asante Union
 Aussa – Sultanate of Aussa
 – Austro-Hungarian Empire

B
Baguirmi – Kingdom of Baguirmi
 Bali – Kingdom of Bali
Baol – Kingdom of Baol
 – Kingdom of Barotseland
 – Kingdom of Belgium
 – Benin Empire
Bhutan – Kingdom of Bhutan
Biu – Biu Kingdom
 – Republic of Bolivia
 Bora Bora – Kingdom of Bora Bora
 Bornu – Bornu Empire
Brakna – Brakna Emirate 
 →  → 
Empire of Brazil (to November 15, 1889)
Republic of the United States of Brazil (from November 15, 1889)
 Brunei – Sultanate of Brunei (to 1888)
 Buganda – Kingdom of Buganda
 Bulgaria – Principality of Bulgaria
 Bulungan (to 1880)
 Bunyoro – Kingdom of Bunyoro-Kitara
 Burma – Kingdom of Burma (to 1885)
Burundi – Kingdom of Burundi (to November 8, 1884)
 Busoga – Kingdom of Busoga

C
 – Dominion of Canada
 Champasak – Kingdom of Champasak
 – Republic of Chile
 →  – Great Qing
Chokwe – Chokwe Kingdom
Chukchi
 Colombia
United States of Colombia (to 1886)
Republic of Colombia (from 1886)
 Congo
International Association of the Congo (to July 1, 1885)
Congo Free State (from July 1, 1885)
 – Republic of Costa Rica

D

Dagbon – Kingdom of Dagbon
 Dahomey – Kingdom of Dahomey
 Dai Nam – Dai Nam Realm (to August 25, 1883)
 – Kingdom of Denmark
Dhala

E
 – Republic of Ecuador
 El Salvador – El Salvador
 – Ethiopian Empire

F
 Fadhli – Fadhli Sultanate (to 1888)
 France – French Republic
 Futa Jallon – Imamate of Futa Jallon

G
Garo – Kingdom of Garo (to 1883)
Gaza – Gaza Empire
Geledi – Geledi Sultanate
Gera – Kingdom of Gera (to 1887)
 – German Empire
Gomma – Kingdom of Gomma (to 1886)
 Gowa
 Greece – Kingdom of Greece
 Guatemala – Republic of Guatemala
Gumma – Kingdom of Gumma (to 1885)
Gyaaman – State of Gyaaman

H
 Ha'il – Emirate of Ha'il
 – Republic of Haiti
  Harar – Emirate of Harar (to 1887)
 Hawaii – Kingdom of Hawaii
 – Republic of Honduras
 Huahine – Kingdom of Huahine
 Hunza – State of Hunza

I
Igala – Igala Kingdom 
Igara – Kingdom of Igara
Ilé-Ifẹ̀ – Ilé-Ifẹ̀ Kingdom 
 Isaaq – Isaaq Sultanate (to 1884)
 Italy – Kingdom of Italy

J
Janjero – Kingdom of Janjero
 – Empire of Japan
Jimma – Kingdom of Jimma (to 1884)
 Johor – Sultanate of Johor (to December 11, 1885)
 – Jolof Kingdom (to 1889)

K
Kaffa – Kingdom of Kaffa
Kajara – Kajara Kingdom
 Kakongo – Kingdom of Kakongo (to 1885)
 Kano – Emirate of Kano
Kasanje – Jaga Kingdom
Kathiri 
Kénédougou – Kénédougou Kingdom
Khasso – Kingdom of Khasso (to 1880)
Kong – Kong Empire
 Kongo – Kingdom of Kongo
 →  →  →  →  →  →  Korea – Kingdom of Great Joseon
Koya Temne – Kingdom of Koya
Kuba – Kingdom of Kuba (to 1884)

L
Lafia Beri-Beri – Lafia Beri-Beri Kingdom
 – Republic of Liberia
 – Principality of Liechtenstein
Limmu-Ennarea – Kingdom of Limmu-Ennarea
 Loango – Kingdom of Loango (to 1883)
 Lower Yafa – Sultanate of Lower Yafa
Luba – Luba Empire (to 1889)
Lunda – Lunda Empire (to 1887)
 – Grand Duchy of Luxembourg

M
 Maguindanao – Sultanate of Maguindanao
Mahra
 Maldives – Sultanate of Maldives (to 1887)
 Mangareva – Kingdom of Mangareva (to February 21, 188a)
Manipur – Kingdom of Manipur
Maravi – Kingdom of Maravi
Matabeleland – Matabele Kingdom
Mbunda – Mbunda Kingdom
 Merina  – Kingdom of Imerina
 – United Mexican States
 – Principality of Monaco
 – Principality of Montenegro
 Moresnet – Neutral Moresnet
 – Sultanate of Morocco
Mossi Kingdoms – Mossi Empire
Mthwakazi – Kingdom of Mthwakazi
 Muscat and Oman – Sultanate of Muscat and Oman
Mutayr – Emirate of Mutayr

N
 Negeri Sembilan – Negeri Sembilan
 Nepal – Kingdom of Nepal
 – Kingdom of The Netherlands
 →  Nicaragua – Republic of Nicaragua
 Norway – Kingdom of Norway (in personal union with Sweden)

O

 – Sublime Ottoman State
Oyo – Oyo Empire

P
 Pahang – Sultanate of Pahang (to 1888)
 – Republic of Paraguay
 Persia – Sublime State of Persia
 – Peruvian Republic
 Portugal – Kingdom of Portugal

Q 
 Qu'aiti – Qu'aiti Sultanate of Shihr and Mukalla (to 1888)

R
 →  Raiatea – Kingdom of Raiatea (to 19 March 1888)
 Rapa Nui – Kingdom of Rapa Nui (to September 9, 1888)
 Rarotonga – Kingdom of Rarotonga (to 1888)
Red Nation
 Romania
 United Principalities of Romania (to March 15, 1881)
 Kingdom of Romania (from March 15, 1881)
 →  Russia – Russian Empire
Rwanda – Kingdom of Rwanda (to 1885)

S
Samoa – Kingdom of Samoa
 – Most Serene Republic of San Marino
 – Kingdom of Sarawak
 Selangor – Sultanate of Selangor
 →  Serbia
Principality of Serbia (to March 6, 1882)
Kingdom of Serbia (from March 6, 1882)
 Setul Mambang Segara – Kingdom of Setul Mambang Segara
 – Kingdom of Siam
 Sokoto – Sokoto Caliphate
 Spain – Kingdom of Spain
 Sulu – Sultanate of Sulu
 – Kingdom of Sweden (in personal union with Norway)
 – Swiss Confederation

T
Tagant – Emirate of Tagant 
 Tahiti – Kingdom of Tahiti (to June 29, 1880)
 – Kingdom of Tonga
Toucouleur – Toucouleur Empire
Trarza – Emirate of Trarza
 Tunis – Beylik of Tunis

U
 – United Kingdom of Great Britain and Ireland
 – United States of America
 Upper Aulaqi Sultanate
 Upper Aulaqi Sheikhdom
 Upper Yafa – State of Upper Yafa
 – Eastern Republic of Uruguay

V
 – United States of Venezuela

W
Wadai – Wadai Empire
Wahidi Balhaf
Wahidi Haban
Wajoq
 Wassoulou – Wassoulou Empire
Welayta – Kingdom of Welayta

Y
Yeke – Yeke Kingdom

Z
 Zabarma – Zabarma Emirate
 – Sultanate of Zanzibar (to February 17, 1885)
  Zululand – Kingdom of Zulu (to 1887)

States claiming sovereignty
 Aceh – Sultanate of Aceh
 →  Counani – Republic of Independent Guiana
 Cuba – Republic of Cuba
 Franceville – Independent Commune of Franceville (from August 9, 1889)
 Goshen – State of Goshen (from October 24, 1882, to August 6, 1883)
Goust – Republic of Goust
 Mindanao – Sultanate of Maguindanao
 →  Stellaland – Republic of Stellaland (from July 26, 1882, to September 30, 1885)
 – South African Republic (from August 3, 1881)
 Upingtonia – Republic of Upingtonia (from October 20, 1885, to June 1887)

1880s-related lists